Helados EFE, C.A. is a subsidiary of Empresas Polar.  Its main product is ice cream.  Also, EFE has many desserts centers on the country that distribute its products.

Products
EFE Sandwich
EFE Mantecado
EFE Chocolate

External links
Helados EFE, C.A. 

Food and drink companies of Venezuela
 
Venezuelan brands
Companies based in Caracas